Henry W. Fallon  was an American football and basketball coach.  He served as the head football coach at Hillsdale College in Hillsdale, Michigan for one season, in 1952, compiling a record of 3–5.  Fallon was also the head basketball coach at Hillsdale for one season, in 1952–53, tallying a mark of 2–15.

Head coaching record

Football

References

Year of birth missing
Year of death missing
Hillsdale Chargers football coaches
Hillsdale Chargers men's basketball coaches